Michael Stausberg (born April 28, 1966) is a German scholar on religion.

He was born in Köln. He studied in Bonn, Tübingen, Bergen and Rome. He is now a professor at the University of Bergen, Norway.

Apart from Zoroastrianism, Zoroastrian priesthood in contemporary India and related topics, Stausberg's interests encompass the history and terminology of the scientific study of religion, ritual & ritual theory, and religion & modern tourism.

In 2012 he was elected fellow of the Norwegian Academy of Science and Letters.

Academic career

1991 - M.A.  (University of Bonn).
1995 - Dr. phil. (University of Bonn).
2000 - Docent (University of Uppsala).
2003 - Privat Dozent (University of Heidelberg).
1992-1995 - Graduiertenkolleg Scholarship for „Interkulturelle religiöse bzw. religionsgeschichtliche Studien“ (University of Bonn). 
1996-2000 - Feodor Lynen Scholarship of the Alexander von Humboldt-Stiftung (University of Uppsala).
2004 - Professor in the scientific study of religion (University of Bergen).
2005-2007 - Director for the scientific study of religion (University of Bergen).

Selected bibliography
 Oxford Handbook of the Study of Religion (2016) (ed.)
 Riter och ritteorier. Religionshistoriska diskussioner och teoretiska ansatser (2002)
 Die Religion Zarathushtras. Geschichte - Gegenwart - Rituale. 3 Volumes, Stuttgart: Kohlhammer Verlag
 Volume 1, 2002, 
 Volume 2, 2002, 
 Volume 3, 2004, 
 Zoroastrian Rituals in Context (2004) (ed.)
 Zarathustra und seine Religion (2005)
 Theorizing Rituals (2006/7) (co-editor)
 Contemporary Theories of Religion (2009) (ed.)
 Religion im modernen Tourismus (2010)
 Religion and Modern Tourism (Forthcoming)
 Routledge Handbook of Research Methods in the Study of Religion. (2014) (ed.)

Other academic activities
 Co-editor (with Steven Engler) of the journal Religion Co-editor (with Gustavo Benavides) of the book-series Religion and Reason: Theory in the Study of Religion'' (Walter de Gruyter)

Sources
http://www.hf.uib.no/i/religion/tilsette/stausberg.html 
https://web.archive.org/web/20070612154815/http://www.zegk.uni-heidelberg.de/religionswissenschaft/Stausberg.htm 
http://www.uib.no/personer/Michael.Stausberg 
http://www.michaelstausberg.net/

References 

1966 births
Living people
University of Bonn alumni
University of Bergen alumni
Academic staff of the University of Bergen
Members of the Norwegian Academy of Science and Letters
Zoroastrian studies scholars